Hrar   is a  village in Akkar Governorate, Lebanon.

The population of Hrar is mainly  Sunni Muslim.

History
In 1838, Eli Smith noted  the village as Harar,  whose inhabitants were Sunni Muslims, located south of esh-Sheikh Mohammed.

In 1856 it was named Harar on Kiepert's map of Palestine/Lebanon published that year.

References

Bibliography

External links
Hrar, Localiban 

Populated places in Akkar District
Sunni Muslim communities in Lebanon